The St. John African Methodist Episcopal Church in Topeka, Kansas is a historic church at 701 SW Topeka Boulevard.  It was built in 1908 to 1926 and listed on the National Register of Historic Places in 2008.

It is built of square-cut native limestone.  Stages of construction were completed in 1918, 1920, and 1926.

See also 
 Bethel African Methodist Episcopal Church (Coffeyville, Kansas):  another AME church in Kansas

References

African-American history of Kansas
Churches in Topeka, Kansas
Methodist churches in Kansas
Churches on the National Register of Historic Places in Kansas
National Register of Historic Places in Topeka, Kansas